The Bahumono (Ehumono, Kohumono) people are the ethnic group in Nigeria located primarily in the Abi local government area of Cross River State. They are the largest ethnic group in the region. 

They speak the Kohumono language.

History
 
The Ehumono live along the Cross River and are known to have migrated from Hotumusa around the region of a rock called Ekpon á Rara, which they claim to be their spiritual and ancestral home. The tribe consists of eight villages namely; Ebijakara (Ebriba), Ebom, Ediba, Usumutong, Anong, Igonigoni, Afafanyi, and Abeugo. They are closely related to the Efik, Waawa , Yakurr , Akunakuna, Ekoi people and Annang people.

The Bahumono people during the pre colonial period were adamant to accept the laws of the British administration. They and other upper Cross River tribes foiled the Cross River expedition of 1895, 1896 and 1898 leading to the massacre of several British personnel.  They were once part of the Aro Confederacy.

Culture and tradition
The Bahumono Culture and tradition shares similarities with the neighboring communities . Individuals trace their origin and ancestry through the Eshi which literally means womb or navel, people from the same eshi are considered as brothers and sisters and will trace their origin to the same father and mother similar to the Ananng people. Apart from the Eshi, villages are further divided into Rovone. 

The practice of the Ekpe secret society and fattening room is widely observed while few people practice the Bahumono religion .

Festivals
Major Bahumono festivals include;
 Rathobai 
 Afu wrestling festival 
 Masquerade parade 
 Oboko 
 The annual Humono festival
 The traditional boat racing challenge 
 Obam

Cuisine
The Bahumono traditional food is similar to the Efik, Igbo and  other Cross River communities. Major dishes include
 Fufu 
 Okho(Oha) soup 
 Edikang Ikong 
 Ehkpan

See also
 Usumutong
 Ebijakara
 Ediba

References 

Society of Nigeria
Ethnic_groups_in_Nigeria